Ratnamali Jema was an Indian politician. She was elected to the Odisha Legislative Assembly as a member of the Indian National Congress.

References

Indian National Congress politicians
Women in Odisha politics
1915 births
2014 deaths